Gabriel II, (? – 3 December 1659) was Ecumenical Patriarch of Constantinople for one week in 1657.

In 1659 he was hanged by the Ottoman Sultan for having baptized a converted Muslim, and after refusing to abjure his own Christian faith. He is hence revered as New Hieromartyr Gabriel, Metropolitan of Prousa and his feast in the Eastern Orthodox Church is December 3.

Life
Gabriel was elected Metropolitan of Ganos and Chora on 23 March 1648 for a first term which lasted until 26 November 1651, and again in 1654. After the execution of Parthenius III he was appointed as the new Patriarch on 23 April 1657 with the support of the Greek Orthodox nobility. However the Holy Synod considered him uneducated and unsuitable for the throne, and deposed him a few days later, on 30 April 1657.

After his deposition, besides his diocese of Ganos, he was given the position of administrator (proedros) of the vacant Metropolitan See of Prousa (Bursa). Here he was accused by the Jewish community to have baptized a Muslim, even if actually the baptized was a Jew and not a Muslim. He was also charged with maintaining good relations with the Russians, at the time at war with the Ottoman Empire.

Sultan Mehmed IV was in those days in Bursa, and his Grand Vizier Mehmed Koprulu imprisoned Gabriel, and promised him freedom and honor in change to conversion to Islam. Gabriel refused and was tortured and finally hanged on 3 December 1659.

Notes

1659 deaths
17th-century Ecumenical Patriarchs of Constantinople
17th-century Eastern Orthodox martyrs
Christian saints killed by Muslims
Metropolitans of Bursa
People executed by the Ottoman Empire by hanging
Year of birth unknown
Christians executed for refusing to convert to Islam